My Big Mouth may refer to:

"My Big Mouth", a song by Oasis from their 1997 album Be Here Now.
"My Big Mouth" (Scrubs), an episode of Scrubs